Independent Australian Scouts, previously known as Scouts of Australia (1992 to 2001), is a Scouting organisation operating as a central umbrella organisation for independent local scout clubs or associations. Independent Australian Scouts is a member of the Order of World Scouts and became an affiliate and a successor to British Boy Scouts and British Girl Scouts Association in Australia.


Programme 

Independent Australian Scouts emphasises scouting as a simple, experiential, outdoor activity emulating frontier scouts in being self-reliant, thrifty and resourceful and useful and helpful. The association views the Scout Movement as part of the wider Woodcraft Movement. The association eschews the cult-like idolisation of Robert Baden-Powell, "family scouting", the unnecessary connection of scouting with later, ever more juvenile programs (such as Wolf Cubs, Beavers, Joeys, Keas and Squirrels), the over-involvement of adults, adult over-organisation of scouting, adults using scouting as a social outlet and the monopolisation and manipulation of scouting as a commercial product.

History

Independent Australian Scouts began as the Independent Scouts of Australia in 1986.  The founding members were all former Queen's Scouts, with years of experience as scout leaders who were dissatisfied with the direction, costs and claims of The Scout Association of Australia. The association registered the name 'Independent Scouts of Australia Incorporated' in 1988. After contact in 1991 with the British Boy Scouts and British Girl Scouts Association, Scouts of Australia joined the Order of World Scouts.

In 1992, the organisation was incorporated nationally and renamed Scouts of Australia. Scouts of Australia successfully defended legal claims by The Scout Association of Australia to the exclusive right to use the name 'scout' and the fleur-de-lis scout emblem. The organisation's corporate name was changed to the present title in 2001.

Independent Australian Scouts operated under the name 'Scouts of Australia' from 1992 and registered the business name 'Scouts of Australia'.

Independent Australian Scouts adopted a logo consisting of a fleur-de-lis with a five-star southern cross constellation above the word 'Scouts' and applied for registration of a trademark 'Scout' in 1993, which was later withdrawn in the same year.

Independent Australian Scouts offers a very simple organisational structure.

External links
 Scouts of Australia

References

Non-aligned Scouting organizations
Scouting and Guiding in Australia
Organizations established in 1986
1986 establishments in Australia